Radiatus is a genus of skipper butterflies in the family Hesperiidae. It has one species, Radiatus radiatus.

References

Natural History Museum Lepidoptera genus database

Hesperiinae
Hesperiidae genera
Monotypic butterfly genera